Naval Support Activity Saratoga Springs (NSA Saratoga Springs) is a base of the United States Navy that is located in Saratoga County in Upstate New York. Its mission is to provide support services to naval assets within the New York Capitol region as well as those in neighboring Connecticut and Massachusetts.

History 
NSA Saratoga Springs traces its origin to the establishment of Naval Administrative Unit (NAU) Scotia, NY in 1974 to support the Navy’s nuclear power operations in Ballston Spa, NY. NAU Scotia eventually was moved to Saratoga Springs, NY and renamed Naval Support Unit (NSU) Saratoga Springs in 1999. The command changed its name to its current iteration when it became aligned under Commander, Navy Installations Command and Navy Region Mid-Atlantic in 2010.

Background 
The base is located in one of the most scenic areas of the country, approximately 35 miles north of the New York state capital of Albany and situated between the Catskill and Adirondack Mountains. The installation has a full service Navy Exchange, Commissary, while the installation's branch health and dental clinic, Naval Health Clinic New England share space with civilian health providers off-installation.

NSA Saratoga Springs serves an active duty population of approximately 3,000. In addition to its active duty populace, the small installation supports Naval Reservists in several Naval Operations Support Centers (NOSC) and Navy Recruiters within a 50-mile radius, as well as ANG personnel stationed on Stratton Air National Guard Base in nearby Schenectady County. Retirees are also eligible for certain services on the installation.

References 

Naval Support Activities of the United States Navy
Installations of the United States Navy in New York (state)
1974 establishments in New York (state)